VeggieTales is an American Christian media, computer generated musical children's animation, and book franchise created by Phil Vischer and Mike Nawrocki under Big Idea Entertainment. The series sees fruit and vegetable characters retelling Christian stories from the Bible, with episodes presenting life lessons according to a biblical world view.

The franchise originated as a video series, with episodes distributed primarily direct to home media, first in 1993 on VHS, and later on DVD and Blu-ray through to 2015. The television series VeggieTales on TV! ran on NBC from 2006 to 2009, and two Netflix series debuted in 2014 and 2017. Two films were released: Jonah: A VeggieTales Movie (2002) and The Pirates Who Don't Do Anything: A VeggieTales Movie (2008). The success of the animations helped establish a franchise of related media, including music, stage productions, and video games.

The series is distinguished as the most successful Christian children's franchise of all time. It has sold over 16 million books, 7 million music CDs, and 235 million music streams.

History
VeggieTales was created by Phil Vischer and Mike Nawrocki through the production company Big Idea Entertainment with an overall aim to convey Christian moral themes and teach Biblical values and lessons for a child-based audience. Vischer developed the idea for VeggieTales in the early 1990s while testing animation software as a medium for children's videos. Due to limitations in the Softimage 3D at the time, Vischer opted to avoid the technical production hurdle of designing characters with arms, legs, hair, and clothes. The first animation model for VeggieTales was an anthropomorphic candy bar. Further inspiration derived from Vischer's wife who suggested parents of the target audience might prefer a character who promoted healthier eating habits. Vischer then began to design the characters based on fruits and vegetables.

Vischer then recruited his friends to voice the cast of VeggieTales in the early episodes. Dan Anderson (Dad Asparagus) and Jim Poole (Scooter) who collaborated with Vischer on dramas at their local church, were recruited for the cast. First offered in the direct-to-video market, the first release was the 30-minute video, Where's God When I'm S-Scared?, in December 1993. Softimage 3D was used to animate the characters for episodes until 1999 when it was replaced with the animation software, Maya.

In January 2002, HIT Entertainment sued Big Idea, claiming Big Idea "abruptly walked away" from a 1997 deal with Lyrick Studios, which HIT acquired in 2001. The deal intended for HIT to manufacture and distribute VeggieTales merchandise. Having had no written contract with either Lyrick or HIT, Big Idea arranged a distribution deal with Warner Home Video, triggering the suit. In April 2003, a jury in Texas ruled Big Idea must pay $11 million to HIT—a decision which was overturned on appeal in 2005. Due to bankruptcy concerns from the jury decision, Vischer lost control over VeggieTales in 2004.

On June 29, 2021, Vischer stated in a series of posts on his Twitter account that his wife, Nawrocki and Heinecke had left Big Idea, who intended to recast the voices for their respective characters. He also stated that Nawrocki and Heinecke had been let go from the series several years beforehand for budgetary reasons, being demoted solely to freelance work. They had asked to have a bigger role in the franchise following their involvement in The VeggieTales Show and the company refused, resulting in their complete departure.

A podcast titled Very Veggie Silly Stories debuted on May 17, 2022 and ended on August 23, 2022 with a new voice cast that replaced Vischer and Nawrocki.

VeggieTales: Behind the Scenes is an TBN exclusive feature and documentary that aired on August 19th, 2022.

Characters

The VeggieTales cartoons are teleplays, performed by various vegetables and fruit that live together on the same kitchen countertop. Some of these characters have "real names", and take on various roles in the teleplays. Most of these "regulars characters", such as Larry, Bob, Junior Asparagus, Archibald Asparagus, Pa Grape, Jimmy and Jerry were established in the earliest videos.

Video series

Show format
The videos generally present a moral issue in the opening countertop sequence, either through a viewer question or an issue brought up by Bob or Larry. Usually this is followed by one or more "films" that address the said issue, with Silly Songs with Larry in the middle.

Silly Songs are generally introduced with a title card and a voice-over saying, "And now it's time for Silly Songs with Larry, the part of the show where Larry comes out and sings a silly song." Some Silly Songs have alternate titles, such as "Love Songs with Mr. Lunt", or "Ukulele Karaoke with Bob", where another character sings the song instead. The Silly Song, if one appears, is usually in the middle of the program, often at a cliffhanger moment or in between two stories (although the LarryBoy videos, in particular, often lack this segment, with the exception of League of Incredible Vegetables). Each video ends with this program's signature sign-off: "Remember kids, God made you special and He loves you very much."

Re-issues and re-releases
Big Idea has released a few "special edition" DVDs which consist of remastered videos and additional features not on the original DVD.

Lyle the Kindly Viking Special Edition (also includes 3–2–1 Penguins! Trouble on Planet Wait-Your-Turn)
King George and the Ducky Special Edition (also includes 3–2–1 Penguins! Runaway Pride at Lightstation Kilowatt)
Where's God When I'm S-Scared? 15th Anniversary Collector's Edition (also includes 3–2–1 Penguins! Trouble on Planet Wait-Your-Turn)

Compilation videos
Various VeggieTales videos were bundled into collections. The collections ranged in size from double features to a boxed collection of the first 30 VeggieTales videos. Compilation videos of only the Silly Songs were also released. Several video collections have the songs in "sing along" format and The Ultimate Silly Song Countdown video included the most popular Silly Songs as voted by fans of the show.

Television

VeggieTales on TV! (2006–2009)
For three seasons, VeggieTales on TV! ran on NBC, Telemundo, and Ion Television as part of the Qubo children's programming block from 2006 to 2009. The television show altered the general format by opening at the front gate of Bob the Tomato's house. Bob, Larry the Cucumber, and other Veggie characters then sing the show's theme song as they hop to Bob's front door. The theme song ends with a character making a random comment, such as Pa Grape commenting on Archibald's new sweater. Bob and Larry then wait for the mailman, Jimmy Gourd, to deliver a letter. When Jimmy comes, he happily sings his Mail Song, which Bob and Larry both find tedious. Similar to the opening counter top sequence of the VeggieTales videos, Bob and Larry read the letter and the cast tries to decide how to solve the viewer's problem through one of three regular segments: Archibald reads a story from his Big Book of Oddities, Pa Grape shows an old film, or Mr. Lunt appears with his stick puppet (Paco the Storytelling Mule) and tells a story. The result always proves disastrous, as the story or film makes no sense. Bob and Larry then intervene with a story from a VeggieTales video. The show ends with Bob and Larry wrapping things up by reiterating the story's lesson and Bob thanking the kids for coming over to his house. NBC episodes end with characters bidding the audience a simple "Good-bye".

According to the Los Angeles Times, "VeggieTales has been very successful for NBC in a Saturday morning time slot that has traditionally been difficult for the networks". NBC saw its biggest ratings jump in Saturday morning children's programming since 2003." As a result, ratings on NBC's Saturday morning program had grown from an average Nielsen Rating of 0.5 between 2003 and 2005 to an average Nielsen Rating of 0.95 between 2006 and 2008, with an average of 430,000 children watching each weekend.

After NBC aired the first few episodes of the first season in September 2006, the company chose to edit the episodes to remove religious messages, including references to God. The original sign-off message—"And remember kids, God made you special and He loves you very much! Good-bye!"—was replaced by "Thanks for coming to my house today, kids. See you next week! Good-bye!". The changes were made at the request of the network's standards and practices department to enforce compliance with network policies regarding religious neutrality. The original dialogue remained viewable by users of the network's closed-caption feature.

The conservative watch group Parents Television Council complained to NBC about the changes. L. Brent Bozell, president of the group, complained of the network "ripping the heart and soul out of a successful product". His argument was that if NBC was concerned about references to God, they should not have taken the series.  Bozell stated "This just documents the disconnect between Hollywood and the real world."

The response from NBC stated the editing now conformed to the network's broadcast standards, which direct producers "not to advocate any one religious point of view." NBC spokeswoman Rebecca Marks said "Our goal is to reach as broad an audience as possible with these positive messages while being careful not to advocate any one religious point of view."

Vischer expressed disappointment with these edits, stating that he wasn't informed that religious content would be removed from the series, and that he could’ve refused to sign a contract with Qubo if he'd known of the decision beforehand. He said, "I would have declined partly because I knew a lot of fans would feel like it was a sellout or it was done for money." Still, Vischer said he understood NBC's wish to remain religiously neutral, and he said, "VeggieTales is religious, NBC is not. I want to focus people more on 'Isn't it cool that Bob and Larry are on television."

In The House and In the City (2014–2017) 

A new series, VeggieTales in the House, premiered on Netflix as an original series in Thanksgiving 2014. The series lead is Doug TenNapel and features a theme song by independent studio musician and frequent TenNapel collaborator Terry Scott Taylor. The deal between current VeggieTales owner DreamWorks Animation and Netflix calls for the release of 75 episodes over a three-year period with each episode featuring two 11-minute stories.

Mike Nawrocki and Phil Vischer continue to voice their characters, but the rest of the original video cast has been replaced by veteran voice actors Tress MacNeille and Rob Paulsen. The series is an expansion of the kitchen counter top segments of the original videos to include a full city which the characters live in. Bob and Larry live as roommates in an apartment west of the kitchen counter. Several stories revolve around a general store built into the bottom-right corner of a kitchen counter which is run by Pa Grape. The cast from the original videos remains the same aside from the absence of Mr. Nezzer, who has been replaced by a similar looking character named Ichabeezer (voiced by Paulsen). Themes in each episode relate to Biblical principles such as forgiveness, compassion and generosity.

In 2017, VeggieTales in the House ended, and a new series was developed, to continue VeggieTales on Netflix. The series was called VeggieTales in the City.

The VeggieTales Show (2019–2022) 

In March 2019, it was announced that the Trinity Broadcasting Network was to inherit the broadcasting rights to air a new VeggieTales series on their networks. Vischer confirmed via Twitter, he and Nawrocki were to return to Big Idea Entertainment as full-time staff to work on the series, tentatively titled The VeggieTales Show.

On April 24, 2019, the VeggieTales Official YouTube channel published a video called "VeggieTales is Back: Brand New VeggieTales Show Trailer" which provided information about The VeggieTales Show. The show started airing on TBN in 2019. This version of the show focuses on the VeggieTales characters acting in on shows of Bible stories in a theater. The series brought back Mr. Nezzer (albeit with voice actor David Mann), as the owner of the theater in which the show takes place. The first episode was a Christmas special called The Best Christmas Gift. This premiered on TBN Christmas Day 2019 and was distributed on DVD and Digital by Universal Pictures Home Entertainment.

In 2019, Yippee TV became the exclusive streaming service of The VeggieTales Show and released episodes monthly in 2019–2022.

Films

 Jonah: A VeggieTales Movie (2002): Archibald Asparagus stars as Jonah in this version of the Biblical story. The Veggies learn God is a God of second chances, and that we need to give second chances too and be compassionate and merciful.
 The Pirates Who Don't Do Anything: A VeggieTales Movie (2008): Three lazy wannabe pirates go back in time to the 17th century, to fight real pirates and become heroes in a battle, to rescue a royal family from an evil tyrant. The three slackers learn that a hero doesn't have to be tall, strong, and handsome to be useful.
 The Bob and Larry Movie (TBA): The origin story of VeggieTales hosts Bob the Tomato and Larry the Cucumber reveals how they met, how they got their own show, and answers the question how vegetables and fruit talk. This was the first film in the series to feature humans. According to Phil Vischer, "Since Jonah: A VeggieTales Movie was our Ten Commandments, The Bob and Larry Movie would be our Toy Story." The Bob and Larry Movie was originally planned to be the second VeggieTales movie with a released date in late 2005. It was placed into production in early 2002, toward the end of production of Jonah: A VeggieTales Movie (2002). However, Big Idea Productions fell into bankruptcy in late 2002 and the film was placed on hiatus, deemed too expensive. Phil Vischer then wrote The Pirates Who Don't Do Anything: A VeggieTales Movie to replace this movie. In 2008, it was considered to be the sequel to The Pirates who Don't Do Anything: A VeggieTales Movie, but talks stalled after the 2008 recession had led to the bankruptcy of VeggieTales owner Entertainment Rights and Classic Media. According to Phil Vischer in 2018, "I have a copy of The Bob and Larry script on my laptop, but probably won't release it because it is technically owned by Universal Pictures and DreamWorks Animation. It will hopefully be produced in the near future." According to Vischer, the film would have begun with a brief synopsis of how talking vegetables were involved in world history, which would be described as a "rare, but recurring phenomenon". One example would have shown tomb paintings of a pharaoh consulting with a leek. Bob the Tomato would be working in local TV news hosting a segment called "Farm Report", while Larry the Cucumber would work as a tester at a chicken hat factory (on account of the fact that his head was chicken-sized).  Bob would make a report on the factory, and first meet Larry through several antics involving the chicken hats. Bob the Tomato would also be renting an apartment in a nightstand of a human boy named Dexter.
 Untitled VeggieTales film (TBA): At the National Religious Broadcast 2019 Convention in California, Phil Vischer and Mike Nawrocki announced Vischer and Universal Pictures are developing a new VeggieTales movie. DreamWorks Animation will have no known involvement in the movie.  Vischer confirmed that the film will not  be The Bob and Larry Movie, but will be similar to Jonah: A VeggieTales Movie, centered around a Bible story. In early 2019, Universal Studios committed to funding the development of a script and will later decide whether or not to produce the film based on the script. Vischer then devoted a year and a half to writing the screenplay. On July 8, 2020, Vischer announced on the Holy Post Podcast that he had completed and turned in the first draft of the screenplay a few weeks prior. He was given notes and was given the go ahead to revise and write a second draft before the official pitch to studio executives. On December 29, 2020, Phil Vischer announced on his monthly Patreon live stream for his Podcast that he had completed the final draft of the screenplay and Universal Studios was currently in talks with a co-production partner for the film.

Other media

Stage production
VeggieTales Live is a series of stage shows based on the VeggieTales videos. The first stage series was part of a two-year agreement with Clear Channel in 2002. Six versions of the shows have been staged. The shows have toured across the U.S. and at theme parks including Dollywood and Silver Dollar City.

Video games
Big Idea, and its successors, have released VeggieTales themed games on various platforms including PC, Macintosh, iOS, and Android. Applications include games revolving around specific VeggieTales episodes (such as the PlayStation 2 release of LarryBoy and the Bad Apple) to new content revolving around various VeggieTales characters.

PC
The Mystery of Veggie Island (2002)
Veggie Carnival (2002)
Jonah: A VeggieTales Game (2002)
VeggieTales Creativity City (2003)
Minnesota Cuke and the Coconut Apes (September 30, 2003)
VeggieTales Super Silly Fun! (2005)
VeggieTales Dance Dance Dance (2006)

Console
LarryBoy and the Bad Apple, PlayStation 2 and Game Boy Advance (2006)
VeggieTales games shipped pre-bundled in the  Game Wave Family Entertainment System.

Android and iOS
Step-by-Story presents: The Goofy Gift (2011)
VeggieTales Spotisodes Collection (2012)
Step-by-Story presents: Larry's Missing Music (2012)

Music

There have been over 45 musical albums released that tie into either VeggieTales characters or videos. Some albums are compilations of songs from the various videos, such as Larry-Boy Soundtrack, A Very Veggie Easter, and 25 Favorite Very VeggieTunes. Others contain completely original material, such as stories or songs performed by Phil Vischer, Mike Nawrocki, and the other VeggieTales voice talent, such as Bob and Larry's Campfire Songs, Christian Hit Music, and Bob and Larry Sing the 80's.

Merchandise

On August 7, 1998, Fisher Price introduced several VeggieTales products, including the "Bounce N Talk Veggies", "Sing N Dance Bob and Larry", "Junior Asparagus Bedtime Friend", "Veggie Bunch", "Talking Clip Ons", "Dress Up Mix Up Larry", "Larryboy", "Larrymobile", and the "Figure Pack".
The Fisher Price products from their merchandise were sold at Walmart, Kmart, Toys R Us and Target stores until the end of 2004. On January 1, 2005, Fisher Price sold the VeggieTales toys to Blue Box Toys until they stopped making the products in 2009. However, Blue Box Toys has VeggieTales products since 2002.
On February 10, 2011, Big Idea Entertainment announced several new product promotions, including partnerships with Chick-fil-A (kids meal promotions), American Puzzle Company (wooden puzzles and trains), CTI Industries (mylar and latex balloons), Tabbies (index tabs, stickers, temporary tattoos and wall clings), Victory Designs (children's guitars), and Zoobies (plush pillows and blankets).

Books and comics 

In June 2014, B&H Kids announced plans to produce a VeggieTales comic with Big Idea Productions and DreamWorks Animation.

Reception and awards 
VeggieTales has been nominated for three Emmy Awards, four Annie Awards, thirteen GMA Dove Awards, six Parents' Choice Awards, two Chicago Film Festival Awards, one Movieguide Award, one Golden Reel Award, and one International World Animation Celebration Festival Award. It was one of the earliest computer animated franchises, predating both ReBoot and Toy Story.

As of 2019, VeggieTales has sold 75 million videos (VHS, DVD, and Blu-Ray), 16 million books, 7 million music albums, and 235 million music streams. The revenue for Big Idea grew between 1996 and 1999 by 3300% from $1.3 million to over $44 million as the moral tales and off-beat humor proved popular with parents. According to Phil Vischer's book, Me, Myself, and Bob, "one third of American homes owned a Veggietales video by the year 2000". The Wall Street Journal commented on the franchise's success that "VeggieTales is the Barney of the group. It's simple characters, bright colors and catchy tunes sweeten the Christian message...The real appeal of the veggies is their wackiness. Like Bugs Bunny,  the cartoons contain a multitude of adult jokes, and like a sanitized version of South Park, Comedy Central's raunchy cartoon, they rely on gross-out humor. Among evangelical Christian young adults, the veggies have a cult following, analogous to the adult audience of South Park.

Jonah: A VeggieTales Movie currently holds a 65% approval rating on Rotten Tomatoes based on 55 reviews from critics, with an average score of 5.8 out of 10. The Pirates Who Don't Do Anything received a 39% approval rating on Rotten Tomatoes based on 33 reviews, with an average rating of 4.7/10. Their summary of critical consensus was, "This Veggietale should please the youngest crowds, but the silly script will tire the more discerning viewer."

References

External links

VeggieTales at CEGAnMo.com

 
Mass media franchises introduced in 1993
1990s American animated television series
1990s American children's comedy television series
1990s American musical comedy television series
1993 American television series debuts
2000s American animated television series
2000s American children's comedy television series
2000s American musical comedy television series
2010s American animated television series
2010s American children's comedy television series
2010s American musical comedy television series
2015 American television series endings
American children's animated comedy television series
American children's animated education television series
American children's animated fantasy television series
American children's animated musical television series
American computer-animated television series
Animated film series
Big Idea Entertainment television series
Christian animation
Christian children's television series
DreamWorks Classics
NBC original programming
Qubo
Fruit and vegetable characters
Direct-to-video television series